is a Japanese former competitive figure skater. He is the 2005 Nebelhorn Trophy silver medalist and placed seventh at the 2007 Four Continents Championships.

Programs

Competitive highlights

References

External links
 

1982 births
Living people
Japanese male single skaters
Figure skaters at the 2007 Winter Universiade
Figure skaters from Nagoya
Kyoto University alumni